Edward James Lewis (born May 17, 1974) is an American former soccer player and entrepreneur.

During his 14-year professional career, Lewis played extensively in both the United States and England, for San Jose Clash, Fulham, Preston North End, Leeds United, Derby County and Los Angeles Galaxy. He was also a veteran member of the United States national team throughout the late 1990s and early 2000s; he acquired 82 caps, scored 10 goals and represented his country at the 1999 Confederations Cup, 2002 FIFA World Cup, 2003 Confederations Cup, 2003 CONCACAF Gold Cup and 2006 FIFA World Cup.

Club career

Early career
Lewis attended Cerritos High School and was recruited to play college soccer at UCLA. He quickly rose to prominence on the team, earning the Rookie of the Year title his freshman year, and leading his team in scoring in 1995 as a junior. Lewis was then drafted by the then-San Jose Clash in the third round of the 1996 MLS College Draft. He would spend the next four years in San Jose, becoming a full-time starter in his second season. Originally a forward, the lefty moved to the midfield early on in his pro career. This would become Lewis' main position. In his time with the Clash, he scored nine goals and added 35 assists in 115 games and was named to the MLS Best XI in 1999.

Fulham
Lewis signed with England's Fulham, then in the Football League First Division, in March 2000. He spent three seasons there, but did not see much playing time. He made seven league appearances as the club was promoted to the Premiership in 2000/01 season. He only played one game for his club in 2001-02, the season finale against Blackburn Rovers. Overall, he appeared in 22 total games for the London club. His only goal for Fulham helped his side cause an upset when they knocked out one of his future employers, Derby County (then in the Premier League), in the League Cup.

Preston North End
Lewis made a move to Preston North End in 2002 and spent the next three years there.

Leeds United

In June 2005, Leeds United signed Lewis from Preston on a free transfer.

A set piece specialist, he scored memorable free-kicks against Burnley and against his former club, Preston North End. Lewis was the subject of a transfer bid from Wolverhampton Wanderers just before the transfer deadline in Summer 2006, but the bid was instantly rejected by chairman Ken Bates. Lewis was a regular in the 2006-07 Championship season with Leeds, once again playing left wing. In the first few matches of Dennis Wise's reign at the club, Lewis was played at left back, but after that he was put back to his favored left wing, but rotated between the positions as the season progressed. He scored three times for Leeds in the 2006-7 season.

In the May issue of Leeds magazine 'Leeds Leeds Leeds', Lewis suggested that he would be willing to stay at Elland Road even if Leeds United were to drop down to League One. At the end of the 2006-07 season Lewis was voted Leeds' fans Player of the Year being only the fourth non-British player in the club's history to receive the award. After Leeds were relegated Lewis signed a new one-year contract at Leeds and Lewis stayed at Leeds for the first few games in League 1, where he was given the number 3 shirt and was Leeds' regular left back. When Derby County came in for him Dennis Wise decided he could not stand in the way of his playing Premiership Football. Lewis left Leeds as a cult hero amongst the Elland Road fans.

Derby County
Derby County signed Lewis to a two-year deal for an undisclosed fee. He scored an own goal against West Ham United in a Premiership match on November 10, 2007 at Pride Park. Before the start of the 2008-09 season, Lewis agreed to be released from his contract with Derby County to play in Major League Soccer.

Los Angeles Galaxy
Lewis rejoined Major League Soccer on August 21, 2008 and was reunited with recently hired Bruce Arena, under whom he served on the U.S. men's national team. After two and a half seasons with Los Angeles, Lewis announced he would retire at the end of the 2010 MLS season.

International career
Lewis made his debut with the U.S. national team on October 16, 1996, against Peru, a game boycotted by almost all regular U.S. players because of salary concerns. Unlike most of the other players to appear in that game, Lewis went on to have a long national career, appearing in a total of 82 games. He played an important role for the U.S. in the 2002 FIFA World Cup, starting both elimination games and delivering a cross to Landon Donovan for the team's second goal in their 2-0 victory over Mexico.

With increasing competition at left midfield, most notably from DaMarcus Beasley, Lewis began a transition to left back in late 2005, debuting in that slot in a World Cup qualifier against Trinidad and Tobago on August 17, 2005. Although he continues to play left midfield for his professional club, Lewis welcomed the move to left back for the national team.

On May 2, 2006, for the second successive time, Lewis was named in the U.S. squad for the FIFA World Cup in Germany. Lewis started the American's first World Cup game against the Czech Republic at left back, but lost that spot after their disappointing 3-0 loss. After sitting out the U.S. draw with eventual champions Italy in their second game, he rejoined the starting lineup at left midfield against Ghana. His inspired play nearly helped the U.S. team to equalize, but his ball to Brian McBride glanced off the goal post. The United States were eliminated from the competition after suffering a 2-1 defeat. Lewis remained involved with the national team in the early rounds of qualification for the 2010 FIFA World Cup, with his final international goal coming in an away win over Barbados.

International goals 

Lewis also scored an "eleventh" international goal on July 17, 1999; however, this goal does not count toward international statistics because it was scored against Derby County, an English Club Team that he would eventually play for.

Business career
Lewis is the founder of soccer training technology company TOCA Football based in Orange County, California. Beginning as a small startup, the company is now internationally recognized, and has training centers across the United States. Lewis' experience in the soccer world has been integral to the success of TOCA.

Honors

United States
CONCACAF Gold Cup: 2002

Leeds United
Player of the Season: 2006-2007

Los Angeles Galaxy
Major League Soccer Supporter's Shield: 2010
Major League Soccer Western Conference Championship: 2009

References

External links

MLS player profile

1974 births
Living people
American soccer players
American expatriate soccer players
American expatriate sportspeople in England
Expatriate footballers in England
Association football wingers
San Jose Earthquakes players
Fulham F.C. players
Preston North End F.C. players
Leeds United F.C. players
Derby County F.C. players
LA Galaxy players
1999 FIFA Confederations Cup players
2000 CONCACAF Gold Cup players
2002 CONCACAF Gold Cup players
2002 FIFA World Cup players
2003 FIFA Confederations Cup players
2003 CONCACAF Gold Cup players
2006 FIFA World Cup players
CONCACAF Gold Cup-winning players
UCLA Bruins men's soccer players
United States men's international soccer players
Major League Soccer players
Premier League players
Soccer players from California
English Football League players
Association football utility players
People from Cerritos, California
San Jose Earthquakes draft picks